Franco Mussida (born in Milan, Italy, on 21 March 1947) is an Italian guitar player, composer, and singer.

Biography
He is best known as a founder and prominent member of the Italian progressive rock band Premiata Forneria Marconi (PFM), established in the early 1970s and still active.  An acclaimed guitar player, in 1984 he founded the Centro Professione Musica, a popular and jazz music academy, which is widely recognized as one of the most important examples in its genre both in Italy and abroad.  Besides working with PFM, Mussida has collaborated with a number of other musical acts and released three solo albums.
He is a member, of the Empathic Movement (Empathism) arose in the South of Italy on 2020.

Solo discography
 Racconti della tenda rossa (1991)
 Accordo (1995)
 Sinfonia Popolare per 1000 Chitarre (1997)

Books
Franco Mussida, La musica è fortuna, Roma, Sandro Teti Editore,  
Franco Mussida, La musica ignorata. Musicisti e ascoltatori, Editore Skira, 2013,  
Franco Mussida, Il pianeta della musica. Come la musica dialoga con le nostre emozioni, 2019,

Footnotes

Italian guitarists
Italian male guitarists
1947 births
Living people
Singers from Milan
Musicians from Milan
Premiata Forneria Marconi members